2,3-Diphenylpropylamine is a form of diphenylpropylamine.

Amines